{{infobox website
| name = FitGirl Repacks
| url = <ref name=Maxwell>note: Maxwell embedded a hyperlink to https://fitgirl-repacks.site  in the underlined phrase "real FitGirl site"</ref>
| type = Magnet links provider, Peer-to-peer
| country_of_origin = Latvia
| logo = File:FitGirl logo.png
| revenue = Donations
}}

FitGirl Repacks is a website distributing pirated video games. FitGirl Repacks is known for "repacking" games — compressing them significantly so they can be downloaded and shared more efficiently. TorrentFreak listed FitGirl Repacks at sixth in 2021 and at ninth in 2020's Top 10 Most Popular Torrent Sites lists.

FitGirl Repacks does not crack games, instead using existing game installers or pirated game files like releases from the warez scene and repacking them to a significantly smaller download size. The repacked games, usually limited to Microsoft Windows, are distributed using file hosting services and BitTorrent. Download instructions and information for new releases are posted on the FitGirl Repacks blog website and three torrent directories: 1337x, RuTor and Tapochek. FitGirl Repacks is based in Latvia.

The so-called mascot of FitGirl Repacks is the French actress Audrey Tautou as she appears in the 2001 movie Amélie.
 History 
 
In 2012, the group started compressing game files for personal use. After discovering that public repacks on pirate sites were much smaller than their own repacks at the time, she decided to learn how to optimise their own compression. At the time, the repacks were primitive and slow, but they quickly improved. Soon enough, they were repacking games daily. After they realised that their repacks were more optimised than the ones already available, they decided to start sharing her repacks, starting with a repack of Geometry Wars 3: Dimensions on Russian trackers. This was followed by many more repacks, seeing high success.''

References

Year of birth missing (living people)
BitTorrent websites
Copyright infringement of software
Video game distribution
Video game blogs